Thrasyvoulos Zaimis (1822–1880) was a Greek politician and the 21st Prime Minister of Greece. Zaimis was born in Kerpini, Kalavryta on 29 October 1822, the son of Andreas Zaimis, a soldier and government leader before the recognition of Greece's freedom from the Ottoman Empire. Zaimis studied law in France and was first elected to the Hellenic Parliament in 1850. He served four terms as President of Parliament and also as minister in several governments. 

In 1864, he was the representative of the Greek government who accepted the cession of the Ionian Islands from the British government, a gift that coincided with the enthronement of King George of Greece. Zaimis served two terms as Prime Minister and died in Athens on 27 October 1880. Thrasyvoulos Zaimis was the father of Alexandros Zaimis, also a Prime Minister of Greece.

Notes and references

1822 births
1880 deaths
19th-century prime ministers of Greece
People from Kalavryta
Prime Ministers of Greece
Foreign ministers of Greece
Ministers of the Interior of Greece
Speakers of the Hellenic Parliament
Education ministers
Justice ministers of Greece
Greek MPs 1868–1869
Greek MPs 1862–1864
Greek MPs 1869–1871
Greek MPs 1872
Greek MPs 1873–1874
Greek MPs 1874–1875
Greek MPs 1875–1879
Greek MPs 1879–1881
Greek MPs 1853–1856
Greek MPs 1856–1859
Greek MPs 1859–1862
Greek MPs 1850–1853